Count Felix of Monpezat (born Prince Felix of Denmark; born 22 July 2002) is a member of the Danish royal family. He is the younger son of Prince Joachim and his first wife, Alexandra, Countess of Frederiksborg. Felix is currently eighth in the line of succession to the Danish throne.

Biography
Felix was born a Prince of Denmark at Rigshospitalet, the Copenhagen University Hospital in Copenhagen Denmark on 22 July 2002. When his father met the press following the birth, he joked that the baby could be named anything from Ib to Nebuchadnezzar.

He was baptised in Møgeltønder Church in Møgeltønder on 4 October 2002 by the Danish Chaplain-in-Ordinary, Christian Thodberg. His names were revealed to be Felix Henrik Valdemar Christian. His godparents are his maternal aunt, Martina Bent; and friends of his parents, Count Christian Ahlefeldt-Laurvig, Oscar Davidsen Siesbye, Damian Sibley and Annick Boel. At the christening, the musical work Dåbens Pagt composed by Frederik Magle, dedicated to Prince Felix, saw its inaugural performance.

After their divorce, Prince Joachim and Countess Alexandra shared joint custody of Felix and his older brother Nikolai.

The prince attended pre-school at the Garnison Church in Copenhagen, and at age six, followed in the footsteps of his father, brother and uncle at Krebs School in Østerbro. In 2018, he began his secondary education at Gammel Hellerup Gymnasium, making him the first member of the Danish royal family to attend a non-private upper secondary school.

In 2021, the Danish court confirmed that he had passed his entry exam to the Royal Danish Military Academy. In October 2022, he left his (2 year long) Army's Lieutenant Training, which he had begun in August, at the Gardehus Barracks in Slagelse, south-west of Copenhagen. He then started modelling with luxury jeweller Georg Jensen.

Titles and styles

Originally known as "His Highness Prince Felix of Denmark", Felix assumed the style "His Highness Prince Felix of Denmark, Count of Monpezat" on 29 April 2008. In 2022, Queen Margrethe II decided to strip the descendants of her son Joachim of their princely styles. From 1 January 2023, Felix is known as "His Excellency Count Felix of Monpezat". He and the rest of his father's children maintain their places in the order of succession.

References

External links
 Official website

2002 births
Living people
Danish princes
House of Monpezat
Danish people of Austrian descent
Danish people of British descent
Danish people of Chinese descent
Danish people of Czech descent
Danish people of French descent
Counts of Monpezat
Danish male models